"When You Feel This" is a song by Australian DJs and producers Stafford Brothers features rapper Rick Ross and British singer Jay Sean. It was released as a single in Australia on 10 July 2015.

The song peaked at number 12 on the Australian Dance Chart, number 9 on the Australian Artists chart and number 70 on the overall Australian Singles Chart,

A remix EP was released on 28 September 2015.

Reviews
Petey Mac of Your EDM said the song was "a gem", saying "[Stafford Brothers] incorporate a bit of drum 'n' bass into the mix as Jay Sean’s iconic voice hooks you instantly.  It builds into a beautiful, half time groove reminiscent of early Adventure Club, with a euphoric taste. Ricky Rozay takes over, setting a record for only calling himself a boss once, and absolutely kills the verse

Music video
The video for "When You Feel This" was filmed in Sydney, directed by Chris Lilley and Anthony Rose and released on the Stafford Brothers' VEVO account on 18 October 2015.

It features Lilley playing a dental nurse and rapping tortoise. Lilley explained "So I wanted to take the mundane life of a 30-something dental nurse and see her live out her music video fantasy. And because it's a daydream I thought it would be fun to bring the dental surgery turtle to life as a rapper. Everyone liked the idea, I got to play all the characters and I had a lot of fun making it."
In an interview with Cameron Adams from news.com.au Lilley said he's been offered cameo's in various commercials. "certainly if I was smart and wanted a lot more money there’s a lot of money than there is in the music video industry which is extremely low budget. I just do it for fun, this video was so much fun.”

Track listing
 1-track
 "When You Feel This"  3:24

 Remixes EP
 "When You Feel This"  [J-Trick Remix]	4:57
 "When You Feel This" [MORTEN Remix] 3:06	
 "When You Feel This" [9Lives Remix] 4:57	
 "When You Feel This" [Montano & Pizzitola Vs GODLOV Remix] 4:56
 "When You Feel This"  [Sikdope Remix] 3:43

Weekly charts

References

2015 songs
2015 singles
Stafford Brothers songs
Jay Sean songs
Rick Ross songs
Cash Money Records singles
Songs written by Jay Sean